Auto-Estradas do Atlântico, Concessões Rodoviárias de Portugal, S.A., is a highway management concessionaire in Portugal.

Network
Auto-Estradas do Atlântico operates two highways:

 A8, from Lisbon to Leiria via Caldas da Rainha
 A15 from Santarém to Óbidos and Caldas da Rainha via Rio Maior

External links
 Autoestradas do Atlântico

Transport companies of Portugal